Belén Consolidated Schools is a school district headquartered in Belen, New Mexico.

Within Valencia County, in addition to the vast majority of Belen, the district includes the municipality of Rio Communities and the census-designated places of Adelino, Casa Colorada, Jarales, Madrone, Pueblitos, and Sausal. It also includes about half of Tome, and portions of Las Maravillas and Los Chavez. The district also includes a section of Socorro County, where it includes Abeytas, La Joya, Las Nutrias, and Veguita.

History

By 2022 the district joined a co-op with other districts to make purchasing of supplies easier.

In 2022 the district reached an agreement with the city of Belen to jointly fund a school police officer.

Schools
 Secondary schools
 Belén High School
 Belen Middle School
 Infinity High School 

 Elementary schools
 Central Elementary School
 Dennis Chavez Elementary School
 La Merced Elementary School
 La Promesa Elementary School
 Rio Grande Elementary School
 Gil Sanchez Elementary School
 Belén Family School

References

External links
 Belén Consolidated Schools
Education in Valencia County, New Mexico
School districts in New Mexico